Patrick McGuire may refer to:
Patrick McGuire (footballer) (born 1987), English footballer
Pat McGuire (politician), Illinois State Senator
Patrick McGuire, an American Civil War Medal of Honor recipient
Patrick McGuire (Doctors), a character from Doctors
Patrick McGuire, a Scottish personal injury solicitor

See also
Paddy McGuire (1884–1923), silent film actor
Paddy McGuire (footballer) (1889–1916), English footballer
Pat McGuire (disambiguation)
Brian Patrick McGuire (born 1946), American Danish professor of history
Patrick Maguire (disambiguation)